Tuskegee is a city in Macon County, Alabama. General Thomas Simpson Woodward, a Creek War veteran under Andrew Jackson, laid out the city and founded it in 1833. It became the county seat in the same year and it was incorporated in 1843. It is the largest city in Macon County. At the 2020 census the population was 9,395, down from 9,865 in 2010 and 11,846 in 2000.

Tuskegee has been important in African-American history and highly influential in United States history since the 19th century. Before the American Civil War the area was developed for cotton plantations, dependent on enslaved African-American people.

After the war many freedmen continued to work on plantations in the rural area, which was devoted to agriculture, primarily cotton as a commodity crop. In 1881 the Tuskegee Normal School (now Tuskegee University, a historically black college) was founded by Lewis Adams, a former slave whose father, Jesse Adams, a white slave owner had allowed him to be educated. Its first founding principal was Booker T. Washington, who developed a national reputation and philanthropic network to support education of freedmen and their children.

In 1923, the Tuskegee Veterans Administration Medical Center was established, initially for the estimated 300,000 African-American veterans of World War I in the South, when public facilities were racially segregated. Twenty-seven buildings were constructed on the 464-acre campus.

The city was the subject of a civil rights case, Gomillion v. Lightfoot (1960), in which the United States Supreme Court ruled that the state legislature had violated the Fifteenth Amendment in 1957 by gerrymandering city boundaries as a 28-sided figure that excluded nearly all black voters and residents, and none of the white voters or residents. The city's boundaries were restored in 1961 after the ruling.

Etymology
The name "Tuskegee" comes from Spanish "Tasquiqui", which came from the Muskogee word "Taskeke", a name of a Creek settlement at this site, meaning "warriors".

History
The Creek people long occupied this area including a settlement known as Taskigi Town. After Congress passed the Indian Removal Act of 1830 in furtherance of President Andrew Jackson’s goals, most of the Creek bands were removed from their homelands in the Southeast to Indian Territory west of the Mississippi River.

Pioneer white planters and other migrants moved into the area, mostly from eastern Southern states. The planters brought or purchased enslaved African Americans to clear woods and develop cotton plantations. Invention of the cotton gin had made short-staple cotton profitable to process and it became the chief commodity crop of the Deep South through the 19th century. Short-staple cotton could be cultivated in the upland areas of Georgia. Alabama, Mississippi, Louisiana and Texas. Designated as the county seat of rural Macon County, Tuskegee developed as its only city.

Late 19th century

In 1881, the young Booker T. Washington was hired to develop the Tuskegee Normal School for Colored Teachers on the grounds of a former plantation. It was founded to train teachers for the segregated school system and freedmen for self-sufficiency. Washington established a work-study program by which students practiced skills and trades. Over the decades, the programs were expanded. This was later named the Tuskegee Institute. Graduate courses were added and it became Tuskegee University.

Washington was known for his emphasis on education and self-improvement. The institute became known for stressing a practical education with work experience by students, to prepare them for the agricultural and mechanical work available in the small towns and rural areas to which most would return. Teaching was a highly respected calling, as education was a major goal among the freedmen and their children. Washington believed that African Americans would achieve acceptance by Southern whites when they had raised themselves.

Washington led the school for decades, building a wide national network of white industrialist donors among some of the major philanthropists of the era, including George Eastman. At the same time, Washington secretly provided funding for its legal defense of some highly visible civil rights cases, including supporting challenges to Southern states' discriminatory constitutions and practices that disenfranchised African Americans. Washington worked with Julius Rosenwald and architects at the college to develop models for rural schools, to be used with Rosenwald's matching funds to build more schools for black children in the South.

Early 20th century

Beginning in 1932, the school was the site of the now-infamous Tuskegee Syphilis Study (1932–1972), started to test treatments of the disease. 600 African-American men became involved, being offered free medical care by the U.S. government for their participation, while being unwittingly tested for syphilis. With funding cut by the Great Depression, staff cut back on medication to treat the disease and studied the effects of untreated syphilis on patients and their sexual partners. Those in the study who had syphilis were not told, nor were they informed that treatment was available for their disease, even after antibiotics had been developed.

One of the most famous teachers at Tuskegee was George Washington Carver, whose name is synonymous with innovative research into Southern farming methods and the development of hundreds of commercial products derived from regional crops, including peanuts and sweet potatoes.

During World War II, Tuskegee and Tuskegee Institute were also home to the famed Tuskegee Airmen. This was the first squadron of African-American pilots trained in the U.S. Military for service in that war.

Tuskegee University in the 21st century is a center of excellence for African-American education.  The heart of the university has been designated as a National Historic District and was listed on the National Register of Historic Places in 1974.

The Tuskegee Veterans Administration Medical Center was opened in 1923, authorized by Congress. A total of 27 buildings were constructed on the 464-acre campus, which provided housing and a hospital to serve the needs of more than 300,000 African-American veterans in the South from World War I. It attracted doctors from top schools, such as Dr. Toussaint Tourgee Tildon, a graduate of Harvard Medical School. He was one of the first six African-American doctors to work at the hospital; as director of the complex for 12 years (1946–1958), he achieved accreditation for a medical residency program at the hospital. He also worked to ensure accessibility for graduates to good medical positions in the federal government.

In the 1930s, a group of black men from the Tuskegee Men's Club began efforts to get more black voters registered. Beginning in 1941, the group reorganized under the name the Tuskegee Civic Association (TCA). With the group's consistent effort to register more voters, the area's statistics of registered black voters continued to increase. The group and potential voters were often met with obstacles that prevented them from being successful. The surrounding black community showed support and wanted to recognize black leaders in the community. The work of the TCA also had a huge emphasis on educating their communities on various civic duties. Though the existing support for the TCA was not often vocalized, many black community members wanted to challenge the political system that was present in Macon County. The group shed a light on the disparities in the numbers of black people applying for voter registration and those who were successful, even going as far as talking to the United States Commission on Civil Rights.

Voting rights challenge

Following passage of the Civil Rights Act of 1957, activists made progress in registering black voters in the city. African Americans in Tuskegee and other Alabama cities had been largely disenfranchised after passage of a new state constitution in 1901, which included requirements that were discriminatory in practice, including a poll tax and literacy tests.

In 1957, a total of 1000 voters were registered, with the 400 registered black voters nearly equaling the number of white voters. But in the city, African Americans outnumbered whites on a four-to-one basis; among them were many highly educated, professional African Americans working at the Tuskegee Institute and the Veterans Administration hospital. That year, without debate and against the protests of many African Americans, the state legislature redrew the boundaries of the city, enacting Local Law 140, which created an irregular, 28-sided city boundary that left only ten black voters within the newly defined city, and excluded 420 black voters. Those excluded included the entire professional staff of the Institute and the hospital. No white voters were excluded by the change.

The law was intended to guarantee that minority whites could retain control of the city even if more blacks succeeded in the arduous process of registering to vote. Some 3,000 African-American residents protested passage of the law at a church in Tuskegee; they also began an economic boycott of white businesses in the city.  They referred to the boycott as a "selective buying campaign" due to the fact that boycotting was illegal under state law. It lasted about four years, during which twenty-six businesses operated by white proprietors closed down.

African Americans also organized a legal challenge to the law, supported by the NAACP, in a case known as Gomillion v. Lightfoot. The law was initially upheld by the US District Court and affirmed by the Appeals Court based in New Orleans. However, it was struck down by the US Supreme Court in 1960, with the ruling implemented in 1961. The court ruled that the gerrymandering of city boundaries was racially motivated and violated the Fifteenth Amendment to the United States Constitution which states that "states were not insulated from federal judicial review when they jeopardized federally protected rights." The exclusionary gerrymandering was overturned and the previous boundaries of the city were restored.

This case was cited in the later Baker v. Carr (1964), in which the Supreme Court ruled that Tennessee's malapportionment of election districts violated civil rights. It ruled that representation in both houses of all state legislatures had to be based on population, under the "one man, one vote" doctrine, and that such districts had to be regularly updated to reflect population changes.

Post-Gomillion 
 In 1963, Tuskegee was to have been the first Alabama community to comply with a federal order to desegregate its public schools. The school superintendent, C.A. (Hardboy) Pruitt, at first opposed the admission of Black students, but worked with other community leaders to comply with the final order of the federal district court, with plans to admit 13 Black students in September 1963 to what had been an all-white high school. But Gov. George Wallace opposed compliance with the federal order anywhere in the state on the grounds that it would lead to violence. Behind the scenes, Wallace enlisted the aid of Ku Klux Klan members and neo-Nazis of the National States' Rights Party to gin up protests calling for the closing of schools that were scheduled to integrate. Wallace subsequently ordered public schools closed across the state and deployed state troopers on Sept. 3, 1963, to block the opening of Tuskegee High School. The school was integrated on Sept. 10, 1963, after President John F. Kennedy federalized the Alabama National Guard and 13 Black students were among only 165 students to begin the school year, against a total enrollment of about 550.

Johnny Ford was elected the first black mayor of the city in 1972, and served six consecutive terms in office. Lucenia Williams Dunn was elected the first black woman mayor in 2000.

Governance

In the 21st century, Tuskegee has a council–manager government led by a four-member city council, a mayor, and an appointed city manager.

The city council acts as a legislative body of the city, passing laws and regulations and appointing citizens to the city's various boards. Each member of the city council is elected for a four-year term from one of three geographic single-member districts. Tuskegee has one city council member who is elected at-large to a four-year term and serves as mayor-pro tem. The duties of the mayor are to promote the city, communicate with residents, and preside over City Council meetings. As such, the position of mayor in Tuskegee is primarily ceremonial.

Geography
Tuskegee is located in central Macon County at  (32.431506, −85.706781).

Climate
According to the Köppen climate classification, Tuskegee has a humid subtropical climate (abbreviated Cfa).

Attractions

Downtown Tuskegee includes aspects of history in Tuskegee/Macon County from the time of incorporation to the present. It also has a site serving as the Tuskegee Visitor Center and is home to the Tuskegee Human & Civil Rights Multicultural Center.

Tuskegee area attractions include:
 Tuskegee University and the Tuskegee Institute National Historic Site (including the Oaks, Grey Columns, and George Washington Carver Museum) 
 Tuskegee Airmen National Historic Site @ Historic Moton Field 
 Main Street Historic District and North Main Street Historic District
 The Tuskegee Human & Civil Rights Multicultural Center
 Butler Chapel A.M.E. Zion Church, site of protests against 1957 state gerrymandering of the city
 Tuskegee Veterans Administration Medical Center
 The Tuskegee Repertory Theatre/Jessie Clinton Arts Center 
 Tuskegee City Lake
 Tuskegee National Forest·· 
 Kirks Old Farm Museum

Demographics
The table at right shows the effects of the state passing a law in 1957 to redefine the city of Tuskegee in a way that excluded nearly all black residents, dramatically reducing the population by 1960. The city and other officials were sued under Gomillion v. Lightfoot (1960); the US Supreme Court ruled against the state's action. The city boundaries were reinstituted, as reflected by the dramatic "increase" of population in the city recorded in 1970. The population in 1960, with the restored borders, was 7,240, according to the 1970 U.S. Census. Because of lack of economic opportunities in the largely rural area, both the city and rural county have lost population since the late 20th century.

2010 census
As of the census of 2010, there were 9,865 people, 3,749 households, and 1,956 families residing in the city. The racial makeup of the city was 95.8% Black or African American, 1.9% White, 0.1% Native American, 0.5% Asian, 0.0% Pacific Islander, 0.3% from other races, and 1.3% from two or more races.  1.3% of the population were Hispanic or Latino of any race.

There were 3,749 households, out of which 21.3% had children under the age of 18 living with them, 19.0% were married couples living together, 28.6% had a female householder with no husband present, and 47.8% were non-families. 40.1% of all households were made up of individuals, and 12.0% had someone living alone who was 65 years of age or older. The average household size was 2.17 and the average family size was 2.96.

In the city, the population was spread out, with 18.5% under the age of 18, 27.8% from 18 to 24, 18.9% from 25 to 44, 21.7% from 45 to 64, and 13.1% who were 65 years of age or older. The median age was 27.6 years. For every 100 females, there were 78.8 males. For every 100 females age 18 and over, there were 75.6 males.

The median income for a household in the city was $24,251, and the median income for a family was $43,472. Males had a median income of $40,653 versus $26,631 for females. The per capita income for the city was $15,471. About 22.2% of families and 31.6% of the population were below the poverty line, including 40.0% of those under age 18 and 10.2% of those age 65 or over.

2020 census

As of the 2020 United States Census, there were 9,395 people, 2,936 households, and 1,470 families residing in the city.

Media 
Tuskegee has one weekly newspaper, The Tuskegee News, which has operated since 1865.

Transportation
U.S. Route 29 and U.S. Route 80 pass through Tuskegee. State Route 81 goes north from the town. Four miles north up Route 81 is the interchange with Interstate 85.

A short distance beyond I-85 is the hamlet of Chehaw, where Southern Railway passenger trains made stops at the Western Railway of Alabama Depot. Into the mid-1960s both the Southern's Crescent and its Piedmont Limited made stops at the depot. The railway's Crescent was the last train to make stops at the station. The Southern Railway moved the train out in 1970 for a rerouting from an Atlanta-Montgomery-New Orleans itinerary to an Atlanta-Birmingham-New Orleans itinerary.

Notable people
 Ajiona Alexus, actress; born in Tuskegee
 George Washington Carver, agricultural scientist, died in Tuskegee in 1943
 Sadie Peterson Delaney, chief librarian of the Veterans Administration Hospital
 Nella Larsen, nurse, librarian, and novelist; worked at Tuskegee Institute in 1915
 Rosa Louise Parks, born in Tuskegee; she became a civil rights activist in the 1950s in Montgomery, Alabama, contributing to the more than year-long Montgomery bus boycott that achieved desegregation of the city system
 Lionel Richie, rhythm & blues singer, songwriter, musician, record producer, and occasional actor; born in Tuskegee
 Robin Roberts, news anchor, Good Morning America; born in Tuskegee
 Bill Winston, pastor, televangelist, author and entrepreneur; born in Tuskegee
 Sammy Younge Jr., civil rights activist; born in Tuskegee

Sister cities
  South Berwick, Maine, USA

See also 
 List of people from Tuskegee, Alabama
 Civil Rights Movement
 Tuskegee Syphilis Study, an infamous clinical study

Gallery

References

External links
 

 
Cities in Alabama
Cities in Macon County, Alabama
Micropolitan areas of Alabama
County seats in Alabama
Alabama placenames of Native American origin
Columbus metropolitan area, Georgia
1833 establishments in Alabama